Tristania may refer to:

 Tristania (band), Norwegian gothic metal band
 Tristania (plant), genus of flowering plants native to Australia